The Deputy Chief Minister of Goa is a position of the Cabinet in the Government of Goa. There current are two Deputy Chief Minister of Goa Vacant.

Deputy Chief Ministers
The list of deputy chief ministers in the Indian state of Goa include:

Keys:

References

Deputy chief ministers of Goa
Goa
Deputy Chief